Sports kit may refer to:

sportswear
sports equipment